Cameron Sylvester (born 22 June 1986) is a Canadian rower. He competed in the men's lightweight double sculls event at the 2008 Summer Olympics.

References

External links
 

1986 births
Living people
Canadian male rowers
Olympic rowers of Canada
Rowers at the 2008 Summer Olympics
Sportspeople from Mississauga